Smith Cottage is a historic cure cottage located at Saranac Lake in the town of Harrietstown, Franklin County, New York.  It was built about 1903 and is a small -story, wood-frame dwelling sided in clapboard and shingles and covered by a cross-gable roof in the Queen Anne style.  It features an open sitting-out porch under a second story overhang bordered by a round tower.

It was listed on the National Register of Historic Places in 1992.

References

Houses on the National Register of Historic Places in New York (state)
Queen Anne architecture in New York (state)
Houses completed in 1903
Houses in Franklin County, New York
National Register of Historic Places in Franklin County, New York